Algach is a rural locality (a selo) in Algachinsky Selsoviet of Zeysky District, Amur Oblast, Russia. The population was 442 as of 2018. There are 6 streets.

Geography 
Algach is located on the left bank of the Zeya River, 59 km southwest of Zeya (the district's administrative centre) by road. Chalbachi is the nearest rural locality.

References 

Rural localities in Zeysky District